This is a chronological list of parliamentary electorates in the New Zealand which were represented by sitting prime ministers.

Four prime ministers were members of the now abolished New Zealand Legislative Council and one has been a List MP. No prime minister has represented a Māori electorate.

List
The following is a list of all electorates represented by sitting prime ministers:

Notes

References

Electorates